Lee Baek-yun (Korean: 이백윤, born 25 May 1977) is a South Korean activist and socialist politician. He was the Labour Party presidential candidate at the 2022 presidential election.

Career 
Lee was born in 1977 and grew up in Goheung, South Jeolla. His father was a construction worker, and his mother used to work in various sectors, such as food caravan and restaurants.

As a secondary student, he read books about the Gwangju Uprising, which motivated him to be an activist. After graduation, he attended Chung-Ang University in 1996, where he studied Korean but was expelled. He led an occupy movement at the main building.

After finishing national service, Lee did not return to university, but applied to Donghee Auto Co. Ltd., where Kia Morning was produced, in 2005. As a temporary employee, he organised a trade union and fought for the rights of temporary workers. He was, however, fired for not mentioning his university background on his résumé. Another 21 employees that he worked with were also fired. He launched a struggle against the company's decision to dismiss him and his colleagues (including Park Yong-jin), which he claimed as "void". He was arrested and jailed for a year.

After being released from prison, Lee joined the Socialist Revolutionary Workers' Party (SRWP), a left-wing unregistered political party. He served as the SRWP South Chungcheong chairman.

2022 presidential election 

On 29 December 2021, Lee Baek-yun won Labour-SRWP unitary presidential primary, defeating Lee Gap-yong from the Labour Party. He became the Labour presidential candidate after the SRWP was merged into the Labour. His slogan is "Should we keep living like this? If you want to change, SOCIALISM."

Election results

Presidential election

References

External links 
 Lee Baek-yun on YouTube

1977 births
Living people
South Korean politicians
South Korean activists
South Korean socialists